Misty Blue is a 1968 studio album by the American jazz singer Ella Fitzgerald, featuring mostly renditions of recent country music hits. The single "I Taught Him Everything He Knows" appeared on Billboard's "Easy Listening" survey.

Track listing
For the 1968 LP on Capitol Records; Capitol ST 2888; Re-issued in 1991 on CD, Capitol CDP 7 95152 2

Side One:
 "Misty Blue" (Bobby Montgomery)  – 2:30
 "Walking in the Sunshine" (Roger Miller) – 2:32
 "It's Only Love" (Hank Cochran)  – 3:04 
 "Evil on Your Mind" (Harlan Howard)  – 2:18 
 "I Taught Him Everything He Knows" (Sylvia Dee, Arthur Kent)  – 2:47 
 "Don't Let That Doorknob Hit You"  (Vic McAlpin) – 2:26 
Side Two:
 "Turn the World Around" (Ben Peters)  – 2:45 
 "The Chokin' Kind" (Harlan Howard) – 2:02 
 "Born to Lose"  (Ted Daffan) – 3:18 
 "This Gun Don't Care" (Larry Lee) - 2:44 
 "Don't Touch Me" (Hank Cochran)  – 2:56

Personnel
Recorded December 20–22, 1967, in Hollywood, Los Angeles:

 Ella Fitzgerald - Vocals
 Sid Feller - Arranger, conductor.
Dave Dexter, Jr - Producer, with Ken Nelson and D. D. Cavanaugh

Album notes by Dave Dexter, Jr.

References

1968 albums
Capitol Records albums
Ella Fitzgerald albums
Albums produced by Norman Granz
Albums conducted by Sid Feller
Albums arranged by Sid Feller